The Ministry of Territorial Cohesion is a Portuguese government ministry. The Ministry of Territorial Cohesion is responsible for a balanced regional development and for the reduction of regional economic disparities, as well as cooperating with the regional policy of the European Union.

The Ministry was created in 2019, in António Costa's XXII Constitutional Government. In previous cabinets, the regional development sector was usually the responsibility of the Minister of the Presidency, of the Minister of Economy, or of the Minister of Environment.

The current Minister of Territorial Cohesion, and inaugural holder, is Ana Abrunhosa, since 26 October 2019.

References

Territorial Cohesion
Portugal